Koblenz was one of the - at last - three Regierungsbezirke of Rhineland-Palatinate, Germany, located in the north-east of the state.

The region was created in 1815 as part of the Prussian Rhineland, becoming part of the new state of Rhineland-Palatinate in 1946. In 1968 the neighbouring Montabaur Region was dissolved and its territory annexed to Koblenz Region.

Since 2000, the employees and assets of the Bezirksregierungen form the Aufsichts- und Dienstleistungsdirektion Trier (Supervisory and Service Directorate Trier) and the Struktur- und Genehmigungsdirektionen (Structural and Approval Directorates) Nord in Koblenz and Süd in Neustadt (Weinstraße). These administrations execute their authority over the whole state, i. e. the ADD Trier oversees all schools.

Kreise(districts)
 Ahrweiler
 Altenkirchen
 Bad Kreuznach
 Birkenfeld
 Cochem-Zell
 Mayen-Koblenz
 Neuwied
 Rhein-Hunsrück
 Rhein-Lahn
 Westerwaldkreis

Kreisfreie Städte(district-free towns)
 Koblenz

Former states and territories of Rhineland-Palatinate
History of the Rhineland
States and territories disestablished in 2000
Government regions of Prussia
States and territories established in 1815
1815 establishments in Prussia
History of the Westerwald
Former government regions of Germany